The Mrkšina crkva printing house was a printing house established in 1562 in the Monastery of Mrkšina Crkva in village Kosjerić in Ottoman Serbia (today a town in Serbia). This printing house was operational until 1566 and printed two srbulje books, The Four Gospels (Четворојеванђеље) in 1562 and The Flower Triod (Триод Цветни) in 1566. In 1567 the Ottomans destroyed the church and its printing house.

Location 
Today the exact location of this printing house is unknown. There are different theories about exact location of the monastery and its printing house, but all of them agree that it was somewhere near Kosjerić. One of the most possible locations is above the county house and  mouth of the river Kladoroba and Skrapež.

Printing 
The books created in the printing house were edited and printed by Hieromonk Mardarije. According to some sources, it was Mardarije who inspired first Dmitrović and then Trojan Gundulić to invest in a printing business and organized all activities during the set up of the printing house in Belgrade. Some sources explain that Mardarije moved a printing press from Belgrade to Mrkšina crkva monastery. Two books were printed in the Mrkšina crkva printing house:
 The Four Gospels (Четворојеванђеље) in 1562 and
 The Flower Triod (Триод Цветни) in 1566.

The Flower Triod is recognizable because in this book Mardarije preferred to use figural motifs instead of the ornaments. This book was printed on 1 September 1566 by Hieromonk Mardarije, priest Živko and deacon Radul. This was the last book printed in the Mrkšina crkva printing house in 1566.

Aftermath 
In 1567 the Ottomans burned the church and its printing house, while the monks fled to Rača monastery, similar to monks from Rujno Monastery printing house who fled there after 1537. After the printing house became defunct in 1566, no other such operation existed in Ottoman Serbia until 1831.

Legacy 

Two copies of the Four Gospels printed at Mrkšina crkva are still preserved in the Monastery of the Holy Trinity of Pljevlja, one copy in Monastery Ždrebaonik and two in Cetinje Monastery. A street in Kosjerić heading to the supposed place of the Mrkšina crkva is named Zoupan Mrkša.

See also
 Goražde printing house
 Vuković printing house
 Crnojević printing house
 Belgrade printing house
 Mileševa printing house
 Rujno Monastery printing house
 Swietopelk Printery

References

Sources

Further reading

External links 
 Online scanned version of the 1562 Four Gospels at the Library of Matica Srpska website

+
Medieval Serbian literature
History of printing
History of the Serbian Orthodox Church
Kosjerić
1562 establishments in the Ottoman Empire
1566 disestablishments in Europe